Adil Aliyev (25 September 1969, Sharur, Azerbaijan) is the president of Azerbaijan Kickboxing Federation and a Member of the National Assembly of Azerbaijan.

Early life and education 

Adil Aliyev was born on 25 September 1969 in Makhta village in the Sharur District, Nakhichevan ASSR, Azerbaijan SSR, Soviet Union. He graduated from the Baku sports boarding school in 1987. Adil Aliyev has been a Master of Sports since 1992. He graduated from the Higher Military Naval Academy named after St. Petersburg Naval Institute, Russian Federation in 1992. He served as an officer in the Azerbaijani Military Naval Forces from 1992 to 1993.

Career 
He held various positions in the agencies of the Ministry of Internal Affairs from 1994 to 2003 - Deputy chief of  39th Police Station of Police Department in Sabail raion, the chief of the ferry crossing sector in Main Traffic Police Department of the Republic of Azerbaijan, the chief of Anti-Drug Police Department in Binagadi raion, the chief of the Criminal Investigation on Police Department in Yasamal raion. He graduated from the Police Academy of the Ministry of Internal Affairs of the Republic of Azerbaijan in 1998 and he became the forward pupil of police in 2000.

Adil Aliyev has been the president of the Kickboxing Federation of Azerbaijan since 2000. He was awarded the rank of lieutenant police in 2003. He graduated from the master's degree of the Baku State University in 2004. Adil Aliyev worked as the head of 16th department of Police Department Baku city Narimanov raion from 2003 to 2005. He was awarded with the state award for heroism medal by the decree of the President of the Republic of Azerbaijan in 2005. He worked as Deputy Chairman of the Defense and Security Committee of the CIS in 2009.

He became a World Kickboxing Association among veterans in 2009. On 6 November 2005 he was elected Member of Parliament from Narimanov Constituency No 20. He was the member of the Standing Commission of the Milli Mejlis on Security and Defense issues, the head of Azerbaijan-Netherlands working group on interparliamentary relations.

He is also a member of Azerbaijan-Russia, Azerbaijan-Ukraine, Azerbaijan-Germany and Azerbaijan-Turkey working group on interparliamentary relations from 2005 to 2010.  He graduated from the post-graduate degree of the BSU in 2010. His monograph titled criminal-law and crime problems of mass unrest acts was published in 2012. This monograph is devoted to the study of the problems of the riots and the crime. He received Ph.D. in law on April 9, 2013. He is married and has three children. Lieutenant general Muharram Aliyev is the brother of Adil Aliyev.

On March 10, 2020, at the first plenary meeting of the Milli Majlis of Azerbaijan of the 6th convocation, Adil Aliyev was elected deputy chairman of the National Assembly of Azerbaijan. At the same time, he was elected head of the Committee on Youth and Sports.

See also 
 National Assembly of Azerbaijan

References 

1969 births
Members of the National Assembly (Azerbaijan)
Living people
21st-century Azerbaijani politicians
Members of the 6th convocation of the National Assembly (Azerbaijan)
Independent politicians in Azerbaijan
Baku State University alumni
Azerbaijani police officers